Dynamic video memory technology (DVMT) is an Intel technology allowing dynamic allocation of system memory for use as video memory, giving more resources for 2D/3D graphics.

How it works 
The amount of video memory is dependent upon the amount of pre-allocated video memory plus DVMT allocation. DVMT, as its name implies, dynamically allocates system memory for use as video memory to ensure more available resources for 2D/3D graphics performance, e.g. for graphically demanding games.

References

Intel graphics
Memory management